Aonghus Clarke (born 1993) is an Irish hurler who plays as centre back for the Westmeath senior team.

Born in Castletown Geoghegan, County Westmeath, Clarke first played competitive hurling during his schooling at Coláiste Mhuire CBS. He arrived on the inter-county scene at the age of sixteen when he first linked up with the Westmeath minor team, before later joining the under-21 side. He made his senior debut during the 2012 championship. Clarke immediately became a regular member of the starting fifteen.

At club level Clarke is a two-time championship medallist with Castletown Geoghegan.

Clarke's brother, Joe, also plays with Westmeath.

Honours

Player

Castletown Geoghegan
Westmeath Senior Hurling Championship (1): 2013
Westmeath Under-21 Hurling Championship (1): 2013
Westmeath Minor Hurling Championship (2): 2009, 2010

References

1993 births
Living people
Castletown Geoghegan hurlers
Westmeath inter-county hurlers